California Free Former was the world's largest skateboard manufacturer during the 1970s. From 1970 to 1981, it was owned by Rick Smith of ALS Industries with a business partner. They also held several licenses from Walt Disney, manufacturing roller skates and other Disney brand consumer products.

Free Former Professional Skaters

The prominent Free Former skaters included:
 Ty Page
 Mark Bowden
 Curt Lindgren
 Bryan Beardsley
 Laura Thornhill
 Steve Ibbertson (Canada)
Glenn McCarroll

World Skateboard Championships

California Free Former also used to sponsor skateboarding competitions, including the California Free Former World Skateboard Championships held at the Long Beach Sports Arena. (Original and reenacted footage from the Free Former World Skateboard Championships was prominently featured in the feature film "Lords of Dogtown.") 

The California Free Former World Professional Skateboard Championships were held at the Long Beach Arena in California. The first competition in the summer of 1976 was the largest skateboard competition ever held up until that time. Its significant cash prizes changed skateboarding history and created a professional tier in the sport.

1976 Results

Men's Freestyle: 1-Chris Chaput, 2-Ed Nadalin, 3-Mike Weed, 4-Gary Kocot, 5-Russ Howell
Men's Slalom: 1-Henry Hester, 2-Bob Piercy, 3-Mike Williams
Women's Freestyle: 1-Ellen Berryman, 2-Laura Thornhill, 3-Ellen O’Neal
Women's Slalom: 1-Desiree Von Essen, 2-T. Brown, 3-Robin Logan
Consecutive 360s: 1-Bob Jarvis, 2-Chris Chaput, 3-Gary Kocot, 4- Steve Shipp, 5-Ed Nadalin

Sept 24-25, 1977 Results

Men's Freestyle: 1-Bob Mohr, 2-Mike Weed, 3-Ty Page, 4-Ed Nadalin
Men's Slalom: 1-John Hutson, 6.515 seconds 2-Bobby Piercy, 6.526 sec. 3-Randy Smith, 6.605 sec. 4-Greg Taie, 6.612 sec.
Women's Freestyle: 1-Ellen Berryman, 2-Ellen O’Neal, 3-Laura Thornhill
Women's Slalom: 1-Terry Brown, 2-Kim Cespedes, 3-Desiree Von Essen
Consecutive 360s: 1-Russ Howell, 2-Paul Hoffman, 3-Ed Nadalin, 4-Steve Shipp
High Jump: 1- Bryan Beardsley, 2-Jerry Pattison, 3-Brent McCullogh
Barrel Jump: 1-Tony Alva (17 barrels), 2-Paul Hoffman, 3-Ed Nadalin, 4-Steve Shipp.
The poster for the 1977 event was done by artist / designer Jim Evans

Skateboarding companies